The Faculty of Medicine at Aalborg University is one of five faculties at AAU. Faculty of Medicine consists of a single department: The department of Medicine and Biomedical Engineering and have at the end of 2010 approximately 750 students about 150 employees.

Establishment
The Faculty of Medicine was established on 1 September 2010 and is the youngest and newest faculty at Aalborg University.

Head
It is headed by Dean Egon Toft.

Departments under Faculty of Health Sciences 
 Department of Medicine and Health Technology
 Department of Learning and Philosophy

The programs under Faculty of Health Sciences 

Bachelor programs
 Sports
 Medicine
 Medicine with Industrial Specialization
 Health Technology

Master programs
 Sport
 Sports Technology
 Clinical Science and Technology
 Medicine
 Medicine with Industrial Specialization
 Health Technology

External links 
Faculty of Health Sciences website

Aalborg University